Hans Cory  (born Hans Koritschoner; 18 March 1889 – 24 April 1962) was a self-taught British social anthropologist of Austrian descent, farmer and sociologist with a special interest in traditional lifestyles of ethnic groups in former Tanganyika, now Tanzania. Little is known about his childhood and youth in Vienna as well as about his life before the First World War in colonial German East Africa. 

Born in Vienna, Austria, and having lived most of his adult life in Tanganyika, he died at age 73 in Dar es Salaam. His publications on a wide range of ethnographic subjects constitute an important record of the history of Tanganyika.

Life and career

Early life 
Cory was born in 1889 in Vienna, then capital of the Austrian-Hungarian Empire, as son of physician Samuel Robert Koritschoner and his wife Rebekka Amalia Koritschoner (née Goldschmidt). He was married to Lillian Koritschoner (née Wolff) and was said to come from a musical family. According to British ethnomusicologist Hugh Tracey, with whom Cory shared his collection of folk music of the Sukuma and Nyamwezi, writings by his Viennese contemporary Sigmund Freud prompted Cory to explore mental illness and African forms of therapy through ritual dances and music.

Cory had arrived before the First World War in the former colony of German East Africa. After the German defeat in World War I, Great Britain took over Tanganyika was made a British mandate territory, and Cory was sent to a British camp in Palestine as a prisoner of war. In 1926, he returned to Tanganyika and became a farmer in Morogoro region, while at the same time pursuing his studies of African life and traditions that he had begun during the war.

Ethnographic studies and publications 
Speaking Swahili and several local dialects, he had a special interest in the cultural traditions of ethnic groups, at the time called "tribes". A self-taught anthropologist and with long years of ethnographic studies based on participant observation, Cory collected extensive ethnographic field data, including traditional music, wall paintings and ritual sculptures. Based on this, he published several articles and books about such diverse subjects as colonial history, traditional law, land tenure, ethnic customs and beliefs, secret societies and witchcraft, food and plants, as well as traditional songs and poetry. 

From the 1930s to 1950s, he collected about 1000 clay figurines used for initiation rites and published several works on this topic, most notably his African figurines: their ceremonial use in puberty rites in Tanganyika. According to German ethnologist Elisabeth Grohs, who studied initiation rites and figurines in Tanzania in the 1960s, Cory donated a large number of these figurines at the end of his life to the Dar es Salaam National Museum. Some of these figurines were published in 1994 in the catalogue for the German exhibition "Tanzania - Masterpieces of African Sculpture", accompanied by art historical essays in German and Swahili.

Based on copies of wall paintings from initiation rites of the Sukuma and Nyamwezi "Snake Charmers" societies, Cory publifished his collection of what he called 'primitive' paintings and his comments about this form of teaching the oral history of the societies to novitiates. In a review of this work, Cory was quoted as follows:

As government sociologist, he further conducted a project from the mid-1950s onwards to collect and codify the customary law of a number of ethnic groups in Tanganyika, such as the Sukuma, Nyamwezi, Haya, Gogo and others. After independence of the country at the end of 1961, these attempts to translate traditional law into new national legal structures were continued. His unpublished papers are collected in the library of the University of Dar es Salaam and, together with his publications, constitute an important ethnographic record of the history of Tanganyika.

After 1950, Cory lived in Mwanza on Lake Victoria, and his last book was devoted to the history of the adjacent Bukoba district. For his services to the culture of Tanganyika, he was awarded the Order of the British Empire.

Literary recognition 
In Ernest Hemingway's account of his 1934 safari in Tanganyika, Green Hills of Africa, Hemingway tells of his encounter with the Austrian farmer "Kandisky", who shared his knowledge of local culture with Hemingway and who in real life was no other than Hans Cory.

Selected works 

as Hans Koritschoner:
 Ngoma Ya Sheitani. An East African Native Treatment for Psychical Disorder, 1936
 Some East African Native Songs. Tanganyika Notes and Records 4: 51–64, 1937
as Hans Cory:
 with M.M. Hartnoll: Customary law of the Haya Tribe, Tanganyika territory. London 1945
 The Ingredients of Magic Medicines. 1949.
 The Ntemi; the traditional rites in connection with the burial, election, enthronement and magic powers of a Sukuma chief. London, 1951.
 Sukuma Law and Custom, London, Oxford University Press I953
 Wall-paintings by snake charmers in Tanganyika. London, Faber and Faber 1953
 The indigenous political system of the Sukuma and proposals for political reform. Nairobi 1954
 Sikilizeni mashairi. Mwanza, Nairobi 1950. (own poems in Swahili)
 African figurines: their ceremonial use in puberty rites in Tanganyika. London, Faber and Faber 1956.
 History of the Bukoba district. Mwanza 1959

Notes and References

External links 
 Cory reading his own Swahili poems for the South African Music Archive Project

Social anthropologists
Austrian ethnologists
British anthropologists
Tanzanian culture
History of Tanzania